"In the Mood" is a song by the Canadian rock band Rush from their 1974 debut album Rush. It was at least two years old when recorded for the album.

Composition
"In the Mood" is three minutes and 34 seconds long. The song was composed in the key of A major and is in 4/4 time. It is the only song on the album written entirely by Geddy Lee (the music on all other songs is co-written by guitarist Alex Lifeson).

Lee said that this was the first song he wrote with Lifeson that they "kind of liked".

Lifeson said It "was probably at least two years old, if not three, when we recorded the first album". He also said: "Ged came in and said, 'I've got a good idea for a song' and played it from beginning to end".

Live performances
The song was always performed in concert (often in a medley, and usually near the end of the final encore) until the 1992 Roll the Bones Tour, after which it was permanently dropped. In live performances, the line "Hey, baby, it's a quarter to eight" was often altered to include a woman's name in place of the word "baby". The St. Louis classic rock radio station KSHE used to play the song every Friday night at 7:45 ("a quarter to eight").

Reception
"In the Mood" was released as a single, reaching No. 31 in Canada   Cash Box said that "the Led Zep sound alikes are in strong form with a more innovative ditty than their last disk" and praised the vocals and backing instrumentation.

Record World said that a live medley with "Fly by Night" "puts the emphasis on fuzz toned guitar and histrionic vocals."

Ultimate Classic Rock thought that it was the worst Rush song released and Greg Prato of AllMusic referred to the song as "predictable". Odyssey rated the song 2.5/5, writing that its lyrics were funny and that its intro riff was very catchy.

Covers
The song was covered by Canadian band Sloan for the 2002 movie FUBAR.

Personnel
Geddy Lee – bass, lead vocals
Alex Lifeson – guitar
John Rutsey – drums

Charts
Charted version is a medley of "Fly by Night" and "In the Mood" from 1976's live album, All the World's a Stage.

See also
List of Rush songs

References

External links
 

Rush (band) songs
1974 singles
1974 songs
Songs written by Geddy Lee